Elizabeth Counsell (born 7 June 1942) is an English actress, best known for starring in the BBC television series Brush Strokes, and for her work in classical theatre.

Career
She played Lady Macbeth to Michael Gambon's Macbeth at the Forum Theatre, Billingham in 1968, and was Michael Redgrave's leading lady in his anthology Shakespeare's People, 1976-77. In 1983 she took the nominal part in Peter Hall's Jean Seberg at the Royal National Theatre. Her film career includes roles in Hot Millions (1968), Anne of the Thousand Days (1969), Doctor at Sea (1974), Under the Doctor (1976), Killer's Moon (1978), and Claudia (1985).  She featured in the Channel 4 comedy drama Hollywood Hits Chiswick, alongside Derek Newark as W.C. Fields.   Her most recent film appearances include the 2012 film Song for Marion with Vanessa Redgrave, and the 2014 film Grace of Monaco starring Nicole Kidman. Her most recent appearance is in the second series of the BBC1 drama The Split (2020).

Personal life
Counsell is the daughter of actress Mary Kerridge and stage director John Counsell, who together ran the Theatre Royal, Windsor. In the 1970s she married the actor David Simeon, and in 1979 gave birth to a son.

Filmography

Film

Television

References

External links
 

1942 births
Living people
English television actresses
English stage actresses
People from Windsor, Berkshire